The Pistolet modèle 1733 was a flintlock cavalry pistol, in service in French units from 1733.

The modèle 1733 was a standardisation effort under Louis XV, inspired by the pistols used from 1731 by the Garde du Corps. Several iterations of the pistol occurred, up to the Modèle 1763.

Sources and references 

Firearms of France
Single-shot pistols
Black-powder pistols